The Voyeur is a 1970 Italian drama film directed by Franco Indovina.

Cast
 Timothy Dalton - Mark
 Virna Lisi - Claude
 Marcello Mastroianni - Sandro
 John Serret
 Aram Stephan

References

External links

1970 films
Italian drama films
1970s Italian-language films
1970 drama films
Films directed by Franco Indovina
Films scored by Ennio Morricone
Films with screenplays by Tonino Guerra
1960s Italian films
1970s Italian films